Aalborg Symphony Orchestra is a symphony orchestra in Aalborg, Denmark. Founded in 1943, it consists of 65 musicians. Based in central Aalborg, it performs concerts at the Musikkens Hus. The orchestra has the status of a regional orchestra of Jutland.

It often performs with the Danish National Opera and at the Royal Danish Theatre. Each season, the orchestra gives a series of symphony concerts with soloists and conductors from around the world. The orchestra has recorded several albums of classical music, including works by Carl Nielsen and Richard Wagner.

Aalborg Symphony Orchestra is a co-organizer of the Aalborg Opera Festival, an annual cultural event.

External links
 Aalborg Symphony Orchestra at Dacapo Records

Danish orchestras
Musical groups established in 1943
1943 establishments in Denmark
Aalborg